Lindsley House may refer to:

 Lindsley House (St. Augustine, Florida), listed on the National Register of Historic Places (NRHP) in Florida
 Lindsley House (Table Rock, Nebraska), listed on the National Register of Historic Places in Pawnee County, Nebraska
Perry Lindsley House, Neenah, Wisconsin, listed on the National Register of Historic Places listings in Winnebago County, Wisconsin